David Gomez may refer to:
David Gómez (baseball) (1902–?), Cuban baseball player
David Gómez Martínez (born 1981), Spanish decathlete
David Gomez (footballer) (born 1988), Brazilian-Israeli footballer